{{Infobox football club	
| clubname    = Brunswick Latvia	
| image       =	
| fullname    = Brunswick Latvia Football Club	
| nickname    = 	
| short name  =	
| founded     =  ''as 'Brunswick	
| dissolved  = 	
| ground      = Royal Park
| capacity    = 	
| chairman    = 	
| mgrtitle    = 	
| manager     = 	
| league      = Football Victoria State Leagues
| season      = 	
| position    = 
| pattern_b1 =
| pattern_la1 = 
| pattern_ra1 = 
| pattern_sh1 = 
| pattern_so1 = _hoops_white
| leftarm1 = FFFFFF
| body1 = 0000FF
| rightarm1 = FFFF
| shorts1 = FFFFFF
| socks1 = 0000FF
| pattern_la2 = 
| pattern_b2 = 
| pattern_ra2 = 
| pattern_sh2 = 
| pattern_so2 = 
| leftarm2 = 
| body2 = 
| rightarm2 = 
| shorts2 = 
| socks2 = 
| website      = 	
| current     = 	
}}Brunswick Latvia Football Club was an Australian association football (soccer) club based in the inner-northern suburbs of Melbourne. The club was founded in 1955 as 'Brunswick' by the Latvian community and competed in the Victorian state league system throughout its existence, until its dissolvement at the conclusion of the 1959 season.

History
The club was initially known as 'Brunswick', assumably being named after the relevant inner-northern suburb where many European immigrants settled in Melbourne following the second world war. Throughout its entire existence, the kit colours consisted of a blue jersey with white sleeves, white shorts, and hooped blue & white socks.https://drive.google.com/file/d/1j3tEjYQBrjpwrtzII-VQ04PwlWhkDmTb/view page 12 In its final season in 1959, the club was renamed as 'Brunswick Latvia'.

The club were premiers of the 'Victoria Metropolitan League South', being the southern conference of the modern day Victorian State League 1, which was the fourth state league tier at the time which was achieved in its inaugural season of 1955. The club's highest ladder achievement in its highest level of competition was in 1958 where the club finished eighth in the 'Victorian Metropolitan League Division One North', being the northern conference of the modern-day National Premier Leagues Victoria 2, being the state's second division at the time. The club's last season was the following season in 1959, and throughout its existence all of the club's home matches were played on the soccer ovals of Royal Park in the neighboring suburb of Parkville.

HonoursMetropolitan League - South (fourth division)'''
Premiers (1): 1955

References

Soccer clubs in Melbourne
Association football clubs established in 1955
1955 establishments in Australia
Victorian State League teams
1959 disestablishments in Australia
Association football clubs disestablished in 1959
Defunct soccer clubs in Australia
Diaspora sports clubs in Australia
European-Australian culture
Latvian diaspora